Sigma Kappa Upsilon Mu is a local fraternity founded on October 13, 1981 at Michigan Technological University in Houghton, Michigan.

Overview 
Sigma Kappa Upsilon Mu’s constitution was submitted to the dean of students, Harold Messe, who ratified it. Sigma Kappa Upsilon Mu was founded by the following twelve men: James Haferkorn, Kent Klausner, John Chapman, Jim Ply, Jeffrey Parks, Mike Mallos, Phil Van Riper, Rick Michaels, Tim Lodge, Joe Rokosz, Paul Brewer, Scott Muller.

History 
Michigan Technological University in Houghton, Michigan was the first college to accept Sigma Kappa Upsilon Mu as a fraternal ‘No-Frills’ original organization. The main incentives that Sigma Kappa Upsilon Mu offers over other Fraternities is “greater affordability and less stringent obligations”. Sigma’s describe themselves as a group striving for loyal brotherhood that isn’t overly strict, this  would be more accurate than calling them a fraternity (as traditional stigma’s emanate).

Following violations of the university’s alcohol provisions and a failure to re-register during the annual registration period, the fraternity’s status as a registered student organization was removed in November 2005.

Symbols 
Colors:
Sigma Kappa Upsilon Mu’s colors are Cherry Red and Black

Animal:
Elephant

Crest:
The Sigma Kappa Upsilon Mu crest is only revealed during the ceremony of initiation.

References

External links 
Sigma Kappa Upsilon Mu Homepage

Fraternities and sororities in the United States
Student organizations established in 1981
1981 establishments in Michigan